Omaha is a village in Gallatin County, Illinois, United States. The population was 266 at the 2010 census.

History
Omaha was established in 1871 as a stop along the Springfield and Illinois South Eastern Railway.  A baggage master working for the railroad, Henry Pearce, named the settlement for Omaha, Nebraska, where he had previously worked as a baggage master.  After an initial attempt at incorporation failed in 1875, Omaha successfully incorporated in 1888.

Omaha is home to many strawberry farms and used to hold an annual "Strawberry Day" in May. In Southern Illinois, Omaha is well known for one of the area's largest and most popular furniture stores, "Omaha Furniture," which has been in business since 1932.

Geography
Omaha is located in northwestern Gallatin County at  (37.889963, -88.303341). Illinois Route 1 passes through the village, leading north  to Norris City and south  to Cave-in-Rock on the Ohio River.

Demographics

As of the census of 2000, there were 263 people, 124 households, and 68 families residing in the village. The racial makeup of the village was 99.62% White and 0.38% Asian.

There were 124 households, out of which 25.8% had children under the age of 18 living with them, 46.0% were married couples living together, 5.6% had a female householder with no husband present, and 44.4% were non-families. 39.5% of all households were made up of individuals, and 23.4% had someone living alone who was 65 years of age or older.  The average household size was 2.12 and the average family size was 2.88.

In the village, the population was spread out, with 20.9% under the age of 18, 8.7% from 18 to 24, 28.5% from 25 to 44, 18.3% from 45 to 64, and 23.6% who were 65 years of age or older.  The median age was 42 years. For every 100 females, there were 97.7 males.  For every 100 females age 18 and over, there were 96.2 males.

The median income for a household in the village was $23,750, and the median income for a family was $36,250. Males had a median income of $25,208 versus $15,250 for females. The per capita income for the village was $12,766.  About 9.5% of families and 18.8% of the population were below the poverty line, including 24.7% of those under the age of eighteen and 16.0% of those 65 or over.

Notable people
 Nathan D. Bryant (1869–1949), member of the Illinois House of Representatives. He was a resident of Omaha during his political career.

References

Further reading
 1887. History of Gallatin, Saline, Hamilton, Franklin and Williamson Counties, Illinois. Chicago: Goodspeed Publishing Co.
 Musgrave, Jon, ed. 2002. Handbook of Old Gallatin County and Southeastern Illinois]. Marion, Ill.: [http://www.illinoishistory.com/ IllinoisHistory.com. 464 pages.

External links

Villages in Gallatin County, Illinois
Villages in Illinois